Elections for Boston Borough Council, which covers the Borough of Boston, were held on Thursday 5 May 2011. The Conservatives became the first of the main political parties to win an overall majority on the council since the borough was formed in 1973 with 19 seats. The  Boston Bypass Independents were almost wiped out, retaining only four seats.  The remaining opposition is made up of four Independents, three Labour and two English Democrat councillors. The overall results, were as follows:

Ward-by-Ward Results

Central Ward (1 seat)

Coastal Ward (2 seats)

Fenside Ward (2 seats)

Fishtoft Ward (3 seats)

Five Village Ward (2 seats)

Frampton & Holme Ward (1 seat)

Kirton Ward (2 seats)

North Ward (2 seats)

Old Leake & Wrangle Ward (2 seats)

Pilgrim Ward (1 seat)

Skirbeck Ward (3 seats)

South Ward (1 seat)

Staniland North Ward (1 seat)

Staniland South Ward (2 seats)

Swineshead & Holland Fen Ward (2 seats)

West Ward (1 seat)

Witham Ward (2 seats)

Wyberton Ward (2 seats)

External links
Results from Boston Borough Council elections, 5 May 2011
Blue is the colour! Conservatives sweep to power at the Boston Borough Council elections
Boston Borough Council elections: The full results
Declaration of result of poll - Borough

2011 English local elections
2011
2010s in Lincolnshire
May 2011 events in the United Kingdom